Mutilation Makes Identification Difficult is the first studio album by the self-described "acid punk" band Brutal Juice.  It was released in June 1995 on Interscope Records.  The album features "Nationwide" and "The Vaginals," two tracks which received airplay (primarily on college radio stations).

"The Vaginals" was retitled "Ugly on the Inside" (after the song's chorus) due to the label's choice to promote it as the album's single.  Later pressings of the album (as well as the music video) bear the latter title for track #3.

A working title for this album was Everything's Coming Up Toilets.  The final title was chosen when the band found decaying human remains in the woods near the recording studio and later read "Mutilation Makes Identification Difficult" as a headline in the local newspaper.

Critical reception
The Washington Post wrote that "those of the band's lyrics that can be discerned do indeed seem brutal, but they're tempered by a surprising pop savvy. Aside from the 15 minutes of ambient indulgence that close the album, these songs are cannily structured and sometimes even catchy." Stylus Magazine called it a "bitingly funny record in spots."

Track listing
"Kentucky Fuck Daddy" – 3:51
"Burpgun" – 3:59
"The Vaginals" – 2:13
"Nationwide" – 5:14
"Lashings of the Ultra-violent" – 2:36
"Kathy Rigby" – 4:23
"Galaxy" – 4:02
"Curbjob" – 2:51
"Humus Tahini" – 5:13
"Character Assassination Attempt" – 3:22
"Cannibal Holocaust" – 4:21
"Doorman" – 5:44
"Whorehouse of Screams" – 20:01

Personnel
Craig Welch - lead vocals, guitar, boom
Gordon Gibson - lead vocals, guitar, keyboard, toilets (the album artwork features several photographs of what appear to be bloody toilets)
Ted Wood - guitar, vocals
Ben Burt - drums, percussion, vocals
Sam McCall - bass, guitar, vocals, pre-production
Emma Gibson - additional keyboards
Joey Gibson - additional vocals (on "Kathy Rigby")
Commander Adama - additional weirdness
Dwayne Smith - road guru
Adam Katz - executive producer, management
Stuart Sullivan - producer
Sylvia Massy - mixer (at Pedernales Studio, except "The Vaginals")
Boo McLeod - second engineer
Steve Starnes - second engineer
Unleashed - art direction+design
David Quadrini - paintings
Vanessa Carlson - band photos
Mariah Aguiar - band photos
Dylan Griffin - toilets

References

1995 albums
Brutal Juice albums